Joseph Coe (November 12, 1784 – October 17, 1854) was a leader in the early days of the Latter-day Saint movement.

Coe was born in Cayuga County, New York. In 1831, while living in Macedon, New York, he joined the newly established Church of Christ, led by Joseph Smith. He was ordained an elder and moved his family to Kirtland, Ohio to join the main gathering of Latter-day Saints. In 1831 he served short missions to New York and Missouri.

In August 1831, Coe was one of the individuals who assisted Smith in laying the cornerstones for the temple at the Temple Lot in Independence, Missouri. Coe was ordained a high priest by Smith on October 1, 1831, and in 1834 he became one of the twelve inaugural members of the presiding high council in Kirtland; he was a member of the high council until 1837. In 1835, Coe provided $800 of the $2400 used by the church to purchase some mummies and papyri which Smith used to produce the Book of Abraham.

After the collapse of the Kirtland Safety Society, Coe became one of the Latter-day Saint dissenters. He was 'cut off' from the church by the high council in December 1837 and was formally excommunicated in December 1838. Coe lived the rest of his life in Kirtland and did not associate with any Latter-day Saint group after his excommunication.

Coe died in Kirtland when he was trampled by his bull on his farm. He was buried in the Kirtland North Cemetery.

Notes

External links
"Joseph Coe", Joseph Smith Papers

1784 births
1854 deaths
American Latter Day Saint missionaries
Leaders in the Church of Christ (Latter Day Saints)
People excommunicated by the Church of Christ (Latter Day Saints)
People from Cayuga County, New York
People from Kirtland, Ohio
Accidental deaths in Ohio
Converts to Mormonism
Former Latter Day Saints
Doctrine and Covenants people
Deaths due to animal attacks in the United States
People from Macedon, New York
Religious leaders from New York (state)
Latter Day Saint missionaries in the United States